Bradley A. Becker is a retired United States Army lieutenant general who last served as the 6th commanding general of the United States Army Installation Management Command from September 5, 2018, to August 15, 2019. He previously served as Chief of the Office of Security Cooperation - Iraq from January 2017 to April 2018. Previous commands he held include serving as commanding general of the United States Army Military District of Washington and commander of the Joint Force Headquarters National Capital Region from June 2015 to April 2017, and prior to that as the 46th commanding general of the National Training Center at Fort Jackson from August 2013 to May 2015.

Becker was commissioned via the ROTC program at the University of California at Davis in 1986, graduating with a B.A. degree in political science. He also has an M.A. degree in political science from Auburn University, as well as a master's degree in National Security Policy and Studies from the United States Army War College.

He was relieved as commander of IMCOM and forced into retirement in August 2019 "due to a loss of trust and confidence in his ability to command". No reason was given for his relief. Though it was stated by Army spokespersons that the reason was not mission-related, lack of military response to complaints of poor conditions in privatized military residences was cited as a possible reason for his departure.

References

Living people
Date of birth missing (living people)
Year of birth missing (living people)
Recipients of the Distinguished Service Medal (US Army)
Recipients of the Defense Distinguished Service Medal
Recipients of the Legion of Merit
University of California, Davis alumni
Auburn University alumni
United States Army War College alumni
United States Army Rangers
United States Army generals